Boris Aronov (born March 13, 1963) is a computer scientist, currently a professor at the Tandon School of Engineering, New York University. His main area of research is computational geometry. He is a Sloan Research Fellow.

Aronov earned his B.A. in computer science and mathematics in 1984 from Queens College, City University of New York. He went on to graduate studies at the Courant Institute of Mathematical Sciences of New York University, where he received his M.S. in 1986 and Ph.D. in 1989, under the supervision of Micha Sharir.

References

External links
 Aronov's Poly faculty page

1963 births
American computer scientists
Living people
Researchers in geometric algorithms
Queens College, City University of New York alumni
Courant Institute of Mathematical Sciences alumni
Polytechnic Institute of New York University faculty